Harlow Giles Unger (born August 3, 1931) is an American author and historian as well as a journalist, broadcaster, and educator, He is the author of many books, including the three-volume Encyclopedia of American Education.

Early life
Unger was born on August 3, 1931. He was educated at the Taft School, graduating in 1949. He graduated from Yale University, where he earned a bachelor of arts degree in 1953, and he earned a master's degree from California State University.

Career
Unger was a journalist for the New York Herald Tribune Overseas News Service in Paris, and later worked as a free-lance news and features writer for newspapers and magazines in Britain, Canada, and other countries. To his work in newspaper and magazine journalism, he added writing for radio and academics, becoming an on-air commentator in New York for the Canadian Broadcasting Corporation and an adjunct associate professor of English and journalism at two New York-area colleges.

Unger is a former Distinguished Visiting Fellow in American History at Mount Vernon (2008), and as of 2020 he had written twenty-seven books, including ten biographies of America's founding fathers as well as a biography of statesman Henry Clay.

Personal life
Unger formerly resided in Paris, France. He now resides in New York City. An avid skier and horseman, he had secondary homes in Chamonix, France, and Jackson Hole, WY. He has one son, Richard C. Unger.

Bibliography
History
 Unger, Harlow Giles (1998). Noah Webster: The Life and Times of an American Patriot. New York, NY: John Wiley & Sons, Inc. 1998. 
 Unger, Harlow Giles (2000). John Hancock: Merchant King and American Patriot. Hoboken, NJ: John Wiley & Sons, Inc. 2000. 
 Unger, Harlow Giles (2002). Lafayette. Hoboken, NJ: John Wiley & Sons, Inc. 2002.  8]87*64 Tennessee 
 Unger, Harlow Giles (2005). The French War Against America: How a Trusted Ally Betrayed Washington and the Founding Fathers. Hoboken, NJ: John Wiley & Sons, Inc. 2005. 
 Unger, Harlow Giles (2006). The Unexpected George Washington: His Private Life. Hoboken, NJ: John Wiley & Sons, Inc. 2006. 
 Unger, Harlow Giles (2007). America's Second Revolution: How George Washington Defeated Patrick Henry and Saved the Nation. Hoboken, NJ: John Wiley & Sons, Inc. 2007. 
 Unger, Harlow Giles (2009). The Last Founding Father: James Monroe and A Nation's Call to Greatness. Boston: Da Capo Press, 2009. 
 Unger, Harlow Giles (2010). Lion of Liberty: Patrick Henry and the Call to a New Nation. Boston: Da Capo Press, 2010. 
 Unger, Harlow Giles (2011). American Tempest: How the Boston Tea Party Sparked a Revolution. Boston: Da Capo Press, 2011. 
 Unger, Harlow Giles (2011). Improbable Patriot: The Secret History of Monsieur de Beaumarchais, the French Playwright Who Saved the American Revolution. Hanover, NH: University Press of New England, 2011. .
 Unger, Harlow Giles (2012). John Quincy Adams. Boston: Da Capo Press, 2012 
 Unger, Harlow Giles (2013). "Mr. President": George Washington and the Making of the Nation's Highest Office. Boston: Da Capo Press, 2013. 
 Unger, Harlow Giles (2014). John Marshall: The Chief Justice who Saved the Nation. Boston: Da Capo Press, 2014. 
 Unger, Harlow Giles (2015). Henry Clay: America's Greatest Statesman. Boston: Da Capo Press, 2015. 
 Unger, Harlow Giles (2017). First Founding Father: Richard Henry Lee and the Call to Independence. Boston: Da Capo Press, 2017. 
 Unger, Harlow Giles (2018). Dr. Benjamin Rush: The Founding Father Who Healed a Wounded Nation. Boston: Da Capo Press, 2018. 
 Unger, Harlow Giles (2019).  Thomas Paine and the Clarion Call for American Independence. Boston: Da Capo Press, 2019.  

Education
 Unger, Harlow Giles (1986). A Student's Guide to College Admissions: Everything Your Guidance Counselor Has No Time to Tell You. New York, NY: Facts on File Publications
 Unger, Harlow Giles (1991). What Did You Learn in School Today?: A Parent's Guide for Evaluating Your Child's School. New York, NY: Facts on File Publications
 Unger, Harlow Giles (1992). But What If I Don't Want to Go to College?: A Guide to Success Through Alternative Education. New York, NY: Facts on File Publications
 Unger, Harlow Giles (1993). How To Pick a Perfect Private School. New York, NY: Facts on File Publications
 Unger, Harlow Giles (1994). Teachers and Educators. New York, NY: Facts on File Publications
 Unger, Harlow Giles (1996). Encyclopedia of American Education. 3 vols. New York, NY: Facts on File Publications
 Unger, Harlow Giles (1998). The Learning Disabilities Trap: How to Save Your Child from the Perils of Special Education. Lincolnwood, IL: Contemporary Books
 Unger, Harlow Giles (1999). School Choice: How to Select the Best Schools for Your Children. New York, NY: Facts on File Publications

References

External links

1931 births
Living people
Taft School alumni
Yale University alumni
20th-century American journalists
American male journalists
20th-century American historians
American male non-fiction writers
20th-century American male writers